Bingley is an English surname; a habitational name from Bingley, in West Yorkshire, recorded in Domesday Book as 'Bingelei'; from the Old English personal name "Bynna" (or alternatively Old English 'bing' ("hollow")), plus '-inga' (lit. "of the people of") & 'leah' (lit. "woodland clearing).

Notable people with the surname include:
Alexander Bingley (1905-1972), British naval officer, husband of Juliet
 Blanche Bingley (1863–1946), English tennis player

 John Bingley, Australian footballer
Juliet Bingley (1925-2005), English social worker, wife of Alexander
 Matthew Bingley, Australian soccer footballer
 Norman Bingley, British sports sailor
 Ossian Bingley Hart (1821–1874), American politician
 Ralph Bingley, (1570-1627), Welsh soldier
 Thomas Stamford Bingley Raffles (1781–1826), British statesman
 Walter Bingley, English footballer

Fictional characters:
 Charles Bingley, character from Jane Austen's novel Pride and Prejudice

References

English-language surnames